Michael Ferejohn (born 1945) is a Professor of Philosophy at Duke University, and the author of the books The Origins of Aristotelian Science and Formal Causes: Definition, Explanation, and Primacy in Socratic and Aristotelian Thought. He received his A.B. from San Fernando Valley State College (now California State University, Northridge) and his doctorate from the University of California, Irvine. Prior to teaching at Duke, he held a Mellon Faculty Fellowship at Harvard University. Ferejohn specializes in ancient philosophy, epistemology, and logic. He received the Richard K. Lublin Distinguished Award for Teaching Excellence in 2012 at Duke University.

References

External links
 Ferejohn's Duke page

20th-century American philosophers
21st-century American philosophers
Living people
Duke University faculty
Harvard University faculty
California State University, Northridge alumni
University of California, Irvine alumni
1945 births
Place of birth missing (living people)